Colasposoma holasi is a species of leaf beetle of the Democratic Republic of the Congo, described by Maurice Pic in 1953.

References

holasi
Beetles of the Democratic Republic of the Congo
Taxa named by Maurice Pic
Beetles described in 1953